Lillian Osborne High School is a high school located in the Terwillegar community of Edmonton, Alberta, Canada and serves the south west area of the city. The school is operated by the Edmonton Public School System and was named after Edmonton's first female school teacher.

Courses

Academics

Competitions
Lillian Osborne High School's budget covers the cost of academic competitions for its students. The school runs many competitions organized by The Centre for Education in Mathematics and Computing such as the Cayley, the Fermat, the Euclid, the Junior and Senior Canadian Computing Competition, the Canadian Intermediate Mathematics Contest, and the Canadian Senior Mathematics Contest. They are also involved in the yearly Science Olympics held by The Association of Professional Engineers and Geoscientists of Alberta (APEGA).

Accomplishments in Academic Competitions
Team placed 1st in Alberta and 25th in the Honour roll for the 2021 Canadian Intermediate Mathematics Contest
Group 4 Honour Roll in the 2021 Canadian Intermediate Mathematics Contest
Two places in the Group 5 Honour Roll in the 2021 Canadian Intermediate Mathematics Contest
Group 3 Honour Roll in the 2021 Cayley Contest
Group 1 Honour Roll in the 2021 Junior Canadian Computing Competition 
Team placed 2nd in Alberta and 49th in the Honour roll for the 2020 Canadian Senior Mathematics Contest
Group 5 Honour Roll in the 2020 Canadian Intermediate Mathematics Contest
Group 3 Honour Roll in the 2019 Junior Canadian Computing Competition
Bronze Medalist in the 2017 Canadian Computing Olympiad
Group 1 Honour Roll in the 2017 Canadian Computing Contest 
Group 5 Honour Roll in the 2016 Euclid Contest

International Baccalaureate Program

Lillian Osborne is one of several schools in the district offering an  International Baccalaureate diploma program.  The IB coordinator is Ms. Jane Taylor. Lillian Osborne has one of the highest IB participant rates in the city of Edmonton.

Languages

Lillian Osborne currently offers 3 language options all in regular or in International Baccalaureate.

French 3Y/9Y

Spanish 10/20/30

Mandarin (Chinese) 10/20/30

Athletics
 

Lillian Osborne has teams for:

Badminton
Basketball
Cheerleading
Cross Country
Curling
Football
Golf
Handball
Rugby
Soccer (Indoor and Outdoor)
Swim
Track & Field
Volleyball
Wrestling

Extracurricular Student Activities
 
Clubs at the school include Mathematics and Computer Science Contest Club, Gay Straight Alliance, Black Students Association Club, Dungeons and Dragons Club, Afrobeats, Students for the Community, Debate club, and Bollywood Club.

Debate Team
In 2014, Lillian Osborne's Debate team won in both categories and sent more teams than any other school in the province to Provincials. Lillian Osborne also won Best Debate Team in Alberta 2013–2014.

In 2023, Lillian Osborne's Debate team sent a team to nationals twice, having a student win Top Speaker at Provincials.

Student Council

Student Council at Lillian is responsible for creating events including: Welcome-Week, Hallo-Week, Winter-Week, LOHS dance, Touch of Class, Lillian Osborne Rockathon, and Culturama. Student Council is made up of around 28 students who are selected through an interview process, and an elected president and vice-president.

LOHS TV
 
LOHS TV was created in the 2019–2020 school year to replace morning announcements. The organization produces live daily updates on news within the school. The production is mostly student-run and all announcements are released and archived on the group's YouTube account. In the 2020–2021 school year, the organization added weekly Mandarin broadcasts that summarized news updates from the week. The Mandarin LOHS TV team broadcasts live every Friday at 5pm.

Fine Arts

The school has a jazz band, concert band, musical theatre, visual arts, drama, graphic design, animation, and photography programs. The musical theatre class performed Alice in Wonderland and the open drama production performed Peter Pan in 2010. In 2011 the musical theatre class performed The Wiz and the open drama production performed The Hunchback of Notre Dame. The various bands perform and have concert nights at the school. The Annual ArtsFest is a year-end celebration of the works produced by Lillian Osborne students in their studies.

Expansion
 
In February 2014, the province announced that they would be putting money in place to expand Lillian Osborne High school to go from a capacity of 1000 to 1600. The architect firm that built the original building was returned to design an expansion. In October 2014, plans were released to the public.

This expansion included:
a second gymnasium, another wing of the school with over 14 new classrooms and 6 new science labs, an extra CTS wing, and a theater with over 300 seats.  This expansion was completed in 2017.

References

External links

Official site

International Baccalaureate schools in Alberta
High schools in Edmonton
Educational institutions established in 2009
2009 establishments in Alberta